(14 July 1787 – 5 July 1834) was a king of the Ryukyu Kingdom, who held the throne from 1804 to 1828, when he was forced to abdicate in favor of his son, Shō Iku. This was only the second time in the history of the kingdom that a king abdicated; the 1477 abdication of Shō Sen'i was the first.

It is said that towards the end of his reign, Shō Kō's "behavior became strange, unbalanced, and unpredictable." The Sanshikan (the council of the top three elder royal advisors) appealed to the government of Japan's Satsuma Domain and, with Satsuma's approval, forced Shō Kō to abdicate in 1828 and to retire to the countryside. An envoy mission was prepared to formally inform Beijing of the change in rulership, and a second royal manor was established in the countryside, to maintain the prestige and dignities appropriate to Shō Kō's status.

Historian George H. Kerr suggests the possibility that Shō Kō did not in fact suffer from any mental illness, but rather contemplated radical actions such as seeking the kingdom's full independence from Satsuma, to which it was a vassal tributary, in the hopes that this would alleviate the intense economic difficulties faced by the kingdom. If this were the case, perhaps the Sanshikan feared that such action was too radical, and too risky, and felt the need to prevent the king from going through with it.

References

Kings of Ryūkyū
Second Shō dynasty
1787 births
1839 deaths